Totești is a commune in Hunedoara County, Transylvania, Romania. It is composed of five villages: Cârnești, Copaci, Păclișa (Poklisa), Reea (Rea) and Totești.

Gallery

References

External links

Official Toteşti Town Hall Site 
About Toteşti 
More about Toteşti 
Information about Toteşti at primariaonline.ro 
Villa rustica from Cârneşti at cIMeC

Communes in Hunedoara County
Localities in Transylvania
Țara Hațegului